Gotarzes I ( Gōdarz) was king of the Parthian Empire from 91 BC to 87 or 80 BC. He was the son and successor of Mithridates II, and was succeeded by his son Orodes I.

Name 
"Gotarzes" is from Middle Iranian Gōdarz, itself from the Old Iranian *Gau-tarza- (literally "Ox-crusher").

Reign 
Coins, reliefs and Babylonian astronomical diaries label Gotarzes as the son and heir of Mithridates II. According to a heavily damaged relief at Behistun, Gotarzes had served as "satrap of satraps" under his father. After the death of his father, Gotarzes was proclaimed king at Babylon. At his accession, Gotarzes appointed Mitratu as the general of Babylonia. Gotarzes continued his father's policy by using their vassal, the Artaxiad king of Armenia, Tigranes the Great, as their representative in their efforts to extend their influence to Syria and Cappadocia. In 87/6 or 83 BC, Tigranes had seized Syria and Cilicia. Gotarzes' had several wives, one of them, Asi'abatar (also spelled Ashiabatar), is known from tablets. The other one, Ariazate, a daughter of Tigranes, was also Gotarzes' wife, and was probably the mother of Gotarzes' son Orodes I. Gotarzes had two sister-wives, Siake and Azate.

Gotarzes used the title of Great King. Furthermore, like the rest of the Parthian kings, he used the title of Arsaces on his coinage, which was the name of the first Parthian ruler Arsaces I, which had become a royal honorific among the Parthian monarchs out of admiration for his achievements. There is not enough evidence that indicate Gotarzes used the title of King of Kings. Under Gotarzes I and Orodes I, Babylonian scholars notably followed wrote cuneiform records in the same method that had been done in era of the Iranian Achaemenid Empire. According to Shayegan, this was done to emphasize the association of the Parthians with their Achaemenid predecessors.

Several hypothesis' have been proposed regarding the end of Gotarzes' rule: According to Gholamreza F. Assar, Gotarzes' died in 87 BC and was succeeded by Orodes I, whose throne was shortly usurped by a brother of Gotarzes, named Mithridates III. According to M. Rahim Shayegan and Alberto M. Simonetta, Gotarzes died in 80 BC and was succeeded by Orodes I. Simonetta suggests that Mithridates III was not a contender of the throne during the reign of Orodes I, but that of Gotarzes, who eventually defeated Mithridates III in 87 BC. Shayegan, to the contrary of Assar and Simonetta, does not support the existence of Mithridates III, and has suggested that it was Gotarzes, and not Mithridates III, who defeated and captured the Seleucid king Demetrius III Eucaerus in 87 BC.

Rock relief 

At Mount Behistun in western Iran, there is a rock relief which depicts four figures paying respect to a fifth figure. The relief, along with its Greek inscription, heavily damaged, was partly reconstructed by the German archaeologist Ernst Herzfeld (d. 1948), and reads the following:

Rahim M. Shayegan (2011), has suggested, contrary to other scholars, that the rock relief was not constructed during the reign of Mithridates II, but during that of his son and successor Gotarzes, perhaps as an attempt to stress the legitimacy of his sovereignty by portraying the prestigious status of himself and his officers during Mithridates II's kingship. He identifies the first figure with the Parthian satrap Kofzad; the second figure with the Parthian commander Mitratu, who first rose to an distinguished position under Gotarzes; the third figure with Gotarzes' son and heir Orodes; and the fourth with Gotarzes himself, who served as "satrap of satraps" under his father.

References

Sources 

 
 

 
 

1st-century BC Parthian monarchs
Year of birth unknown
1st-century BC Babylonian kings
Parthian Dark Age